Parliamentary elections were held in Poland on 19 January 1947, the first since World War II. According to the official results, the Democratic Bloc (Blok Demokratyczny), dominated by the communist Polish Workers Party (PPR) and also including the Polish Socialist Party (PPS), People's Party (SL), Democratic Party (SD) and non-partisan candidates, gained 80.1% of the vote and 394 of the 444 seats in the Legislative Sejm.  The largest opposition party, the Polish People's Party, was officially credited with 28 seats.  However, the elections were characterized by violence; anti-communist opposition candidates and activists were persecuted by the Volunteer Reserve Militia (ORMO). The results were blatantly falsified; the opposition claimed that it would have won in a landslide had the election been conducted in a fair manner.

The election gave the Soviets and the communist-dominated Polish satellite government enough legitimacy to claim that Poland was 'free and democratic', thus allowing Poland to sign the charter of the United Nations.

Background
By 1946, Poland was mostly under the control of the Soviet Union and its proxies, the PPR. In 1946 the communists already tested their strength by falsifying the "3xYES Referendum" and banning all right-wing parties (under the pretext of their pro-Nazi stance). By 1947 the only remaining legal opposition was the Polish People's Party (PSL) of Stanisław Mikołajczyk.

The Yalta agreement called for "free and unfettered" elections in Poland. However, the Kremlin and the PPR had no intention of permitting an honest election. Soviet leader Joseph Stalin was well aware that if Poland held a free election, it would result in an anti-Soviet government. Conditioned in part by the Hungarian Communists' weak showing in 1945, the PPR proposed to present voters with a single list from all of the legal parties in the country. The PSL rejected this proposal almost out of hand. Eventually, only the PPS, SD and SL joined the Democratic Bloc. Every electoral district had Democratic Bloc's candidates on List 3.

The January 1947 elections held under the supervision of the PPR fell well short of being "free and unfettered." The PPR, under the leadership of general secretary Władysław Gomułka, embarked on a ruthless campaign to snuff out the PSL and all other potential opposition. Electoral laws introduced before the elections allowed the government – which since its establishment in 1944 by the Polish Committee of National Liberation had been dominated by the Communists – to remove 409,326 people from the electoral rolls, as 'anti-government bandits' (i.e., Armia Krajowa and other Polish resistance movements loyal to the Polish government in exile). Over 80,000 members of the Polish People's Party were arrested under various false charges in the month preceding the election, and around 100 of them were murdered by the Polish Secret Police (Urząd Bezpieczeństwa, UB). 98 opposition parliamentary candidates were also crossed from the registration lists under these accusations. In some regions the government disqualified the entire People's Party list under various technical and legal pretenses, most commonly in regions known to be People's Party strongholds.

The electoral fraud was organized and closely monitored by UB specialists, who worked closely with their Soviet counterparts like Aron Pałkin and Siemion Dawydow, both high-ranking officers from the Soviet MGB. Bolesław Bierut, head of the provisional Polish parliament (State National Council) and acting president, asked for Soviet assistance in the election. Over 40% of the members of the electoral commissions who were supposed to monitor the voting were recruited by the UB.

Conduct
Opposition candidates and activists were persecuted until election day; only the PPR and its allies were allowed to campaign unhindered. The publicized results were falsified, with the official results known to selected government officials long before the actual elections took place and any votes were counted.

The real results were not known to anyone. In areas where the government had sufficient control, some of the ballot boxes were simply destroyed without being counted, or exchanged with boxes filled with prepared votes.  Where possible, government officials simply filled in the numbers in the relevant documents as per instructions from Soviet and PPR officials without bothering to count the real votes.

A Time Magazine article covering the elections noted in its lead paragraph: "In a spirit of partisan exuberance tempered with terror, Poland approached its first nationwide popular election, ten days hence. By last week most of the combined opposition (Socialist and Polish Peasant Party) candidates had been jailed, and their supporters more or less completely cowed by the secret police, by striking their names from voting lists and by arrest. The Communist-dominated Government ventured to predict an "overwhelming" victory." Historian Piotr Wrobel wrote that this election saw "the highest level of repression and terror" that was ever seen during the four decades of Communist rule in Poland.

Results

In his post-election report to Stalin, Pałkin estimated that the real results (i.e. votes cast) gave the Democratic Bloc about 50% of the vote.  The opposition contended that it had the support of 63 percent of the voting population and would have received about 80% of the votes had the elections been free and fair. The only official electoral document known to exist showed the PSL taking 54 percent of the vote in Kielce Voivodeship to the Democratic Bloc's 44 percent.

Aftermath
Many members of opposition parties, including Mikołajczyk – who would have likely become the Prime Minister of Poland had the election been honest  – saw no hope in further struggle and, fearing for their lives, left the country.  Western governments issued only token protests, if any, which led many anti-Communist Poles to speak of postwar "Western betrayal".  In the same year, the new Communist-dominated Legislative Sejm adopted the Small Constitution of 1947, and Bierut, who was also a citizen of the USSR, was elected president by the parliament.

With the support of a majority in its own right and the departure of Mikołajczyk, the Communist-dominated government set about consolidating its now-total control over the country—a process completed in 1948, when the Communists forced what remained of the Polish Socialist Party to merge with them to form the Polish United Workers Party.

Gomułka wanted to adapt the Soviet blueprint to Polish circumstances, and believed it was possible to be both a Communist and a Polish patriot at the same time. He was also wary of the Cominform, and opposed forced collectivization of agriculture. His line was branded as "rightist-nationalist deviation," and he was pushed out as party leader in 1948 in favour of Bierut.

The PSL lingered on for a year and a half under increasing harassment.  In 1949, the rump of the PSL merged with the pro-Communist People's Party to form the United People's Party.  Along with the other legal minor party in Poland, the Democratic Party, it was part of the Communist-led coalition. However, this grouping increasingly took on a character similar to other "coalitions" in the Communist world. The ZSL and SD were reduced to being mostly subservient satellites of the Communists, and were required to accept the Communists' "leading role" as a condition of their continued existence. As a result, this would be the last election in which true opposition parties would be even nominally allowed to take part until the partly free election of 1989.

See also
 History of Poland#Post-war struggle for power

References

Further reading
Michał Skoczylas, Wybory do Sejmu Ustawodawczego z 19 stycznia 1947 roku w świetle skarg ludności (Elections to the Legislative Sejm on 19 January 1947 in the light of citizens complains), TRIO, 2003, 
Jerzy Drygalski, Jacek Kwasniewski, No-Choice Elections, Soviet Studies, Vol. 42, No. 2 (Apr., 1990), pp. 295–315, JSTOR
Geoff Eley, Forging Democracy the History of the Left in Europe, 1850-2000, Oxford University Press, 2002,  "In January 1947, manifestly rigged Polish elections gave Communists 80.1% of the vote..."Google Print, p.300
George Sakwa, Martin Crouch, Sejm Elections in Communist Poland: An Overview and a Reappraisal, British Journal of Political Science, Vol. 8, No. 4 (Oct., 1978), pp. 403–424,
Richard F. Staar, Elections in Communist Poland, Midwest Journal of Political Science, Vol. 2, No. 2 (May, 1958), pp. 200–218, JSTOR
Nikita Petrov, The Role of the MGB of USSR in the Sovietization of Poland: the Referendum and Sejm Elections in 1946-1947

External links
Results of the 1947 elections
 Pułkownik Pałkin raportuje: Sfałszowanie wyborów w Polsce nie zbulwersowało opinii Zachodu.
 Sfałszowane wybory – 19 stycznia 1947 roku
 Jak sfałszowano pierwsze powojenne wybory, Polityka, 20 stycznia 2007 r.
 Wybory 1947, Institute of National Remembrance

Electoral fraud in Poland
Poland
Parliamentary elections in Poland
1947 in Poland
Stalinism in Poland
Elections in the Polish People's Republic
January 1947 events in Europe
1947 elections in Poland